The Rawhide Trail is a 1958 American Western film directed by Robert Gordon and written by Alexander J. Wells. The film stars Rex Reason, Nancy Gates, Richard Erdman, Ann Doran, Rusty Lane and Maureen Hingert. The film was released on January 26, 1958, by Allied Artists Pictures.

Plot

Cast           
Rex Reason as Jess Brady
Nancy Gates as Marsha Collins
Richard Erdman as Rupe Pardee
Ann Doran as Mrs. Cartwright
Rusty Lane as Captain
Maureen Hingert as Keetah 
Sam Buffington as James Willard
Robert Knapp as Farley Durand
Frank Chase as Corporal
William Murphy as Elbe Rotter
John Dierkes as Hangman
Richard Warren as Collier
Dick Geary as Soldier
Chet Sampson as Telegrapher

References

External links
 

1958 films
American Western (genre) films
1958 Western (genre) films
Allied Artists films
Films directed by Robert Gordon
1950s English-language films
1950s American films